Daniel Dodge Frisbie (November 30, 1859 Middleburgh, Schoharie County, New York - August 6, 1931 Middleburgh, Schoharie Co., NY) was an American businessman and politician.

Life
Frisbie was educated in his hometown and later attended Hartwick Seminary in Cooperstown, New York. In 1882, he married Eleanor Manning, and they had three children.
 
In the 1880s, Frisbie purchased two local newspapers and opened two insurance companies. Later, he was president of the local railroad and utility company. In 1904, as the editor of the Schoharie Democratic-Republican, he was elected President of the Democratic New York State Editorial Association.

Frisbie was a member of the New York State Assembly (Schoharie Co.) in 1900, 1901, 1909, 1910, 1911 and 1912; and was Minority Leader in 1901, 1909 and 1910; and Speaker in 1911. During his speakership happened the last election of a U.S. Senator from New York by the State Legislature: after a three-month-long deadlock, James Aloysius O`Gorman was elected to succeed Chauncey Depew.

Frisbie was a member of the New York State Commission for the Panama–Pacific International Exposition in 1915.

Sources
EDITORS HAVE BUSY DAY in NYT on September 8, 1904
MURPHY PICKS GRADY TO LEAD THE SENATE in NYT on December 17, 1910
WAGNER IS LEADER; GRADY STAYS AWAY in NYT on January 4, 1911
 State of New York at the Panama-Pacific International Exposition, San Francisco, California, 1915 (Albany, 1916; pg. 28)

External links 
 

1859 births
1931 deaths
People from Middleburgh, New York
Speakers of the New York State Assembly
Democratic Party members of the New York State Assembly
American newspaper editors